Martín Osimani (born May 22, 1981) is a Uruguayan professional basketball player.  Born in Montevideo, he is a longtime member of the Uruguay national basketball team and is currently playing professionally with Brasília in the Novo Basquete Brasil from Brazil.

Osimani is currently number 11 for the Argentinian club team Obras Sanitarias.

College career
Osimani moved from Montevideo to Hialeah, Florida to attend high school there.  An All-state player after nearly averaging a triple double per game for Champagnat Catholic High School, he was ranked in the top 100 high school recruits by ESPN.com.  He settled on the University of Utah after considering several powerhouse programs, including Duke University and UCLA.  In his freshman season, Osimani played in 28 of the team's 30 games off the bench, but averaged only 1.2 points and 1.0 assists per game in 8.0 minutes per game of playing time.

Following a disappointing season at Utah, Osimani transferred back home to Miami-Dade Community College.  In one season there, he averaged 8.3 points, 3.8 rebounds, 6.9 assists and 3.5 steals per game in earning All-Conference honors.  After one season of JUCO ball, Osimani again committed to play NCAA ball, this time at Duquesne University.  He started at point guard for two years for the Dukes, and had two successful seasons for the team, including a 172 assist junior season that put him at second on Duquesne's all-time single season assist chart.

Professional career
After graduating, Osimani returned home to Uruguay to play for Club Bigua of the Liga Uruguaya de Basketball Along with Leandro García Morales, he helped lead Club Bigua to the 2008 Uruguayan League title.  In four years as a professional, he has played for teams in Uruguay, Venezuela, and Puerto Rico. As starting point guard, he helped lead Club Sandwich to the 2008 Uruguayan League title. He currently plays for Atléticos de San Germán of the Puerto Rican Baloncesto Superior Nacional.

National team career
Osimani has played for various age groups on the Uruguayan national basketball team since 1998.  He has been selected for the Uruguayans for the last three continental championships, the 2005, 2007, and FIBA Americas Championship 2009.

References

External links
FIBA Profile
Latinbasket.com Profile

1981 births
Living people
Atléticos de San Germán players
Basketball players at the 2007 Pan American Games
Basketball players at the 2011 Pan American Games
Boca Juniors basketball players
Club Biguá de Villa Biarritz basketball players
Duquesne Dukes men's basketball players
Halcones UV Córdoba players
Miami Dade Sharks men's basketball players
Obras Sanitarias basketball players
Pan American Games bronze medalists for Uruguay
Pan American Games medalists in basketball
Peñarol de Mar del Plata basketball players
Point guards
Sportspeople from Montevideo
Trotamundos B.B.C. players
UniCEUB/BRB players
Uruguayan men's basketball players
Uruguayan expatriate basketball people in Argentina
Uruguayan expatriate basketball people in Brazil
Uruguayan expatriate basketball people in Italy
Uruguayan expatriate basketball people in Mexico
Uruguayan expatriate basketball people in Puerto Rico
Uruguayan expatriate basketball people in the United States
Uruguayan expatriate basketball people in Venezuela
Utah Utes men's basketball players
Medalists at the 2007 Pan American Games